Caolán or Cáelán is an Irish name, from the Irish 'caol' meaning 'slender', 'narrow' or 'fine' and is pronounced 'kway-lawn’ or 'quail-on’, depending on the dialect. There are several corrupted or Anglicised spelling variations, including "Kelan", "Keelan" and "Kealan", all pronounced  . It is the Irish form of the English name Colin, with the surname O'Collins (or Ó Coileáin) also deriving from it.

Caolán
Caolan Lavery (born 1992), Canadian footballer
Caolan McAleer (born 1993), Irish footballer 
Caolan Mooney (born 1993), Gaelic and Australian rules footballer
Caolan Ward (born 1992), Gaelic footballer
Caolan Boyd-Munce (born 2000), Irish footballer

Keelan

As forename
Keelan Cole (born 1993), American football player
Keelan Doss (born 1996), American football player
Keelan Giles (born 1997), Welsh rugby union player
Keelan Harvick (born 2012) American cart racer
Keelan Johnson (born 1989), Canadian football player
Keelan Lebon (born 1997), French footballer
Keelan Molloy (born 1998), Irish hurler
Keelan O'Connell (born 1999), English footballer
Keelan Sexton (born 1997), Gaelic footballer
Keelan Williams, Welsh footballer and brother of Neco Williams

As surname
Claire Keelan (born 1975), English actress
Claudia Keelan (born 1959), American poet, writer and professor
Grant Robert Keelan, actor in the film Schemers
John Joseph Keelan (1888 – 1946), lawyer and political figure who represented Happyland
Kevin Keelan (born 1941), English footballer
Michael Keelan (born 1955), weightlifter who competed for England and CEO of the Australian Weightlifting Federation
Richard Keelan, member of Detroit, Michigan band The Spike Drivers

Kealan
Kealan Patrick Burke (born 1976), Irish writer

See also
Keelin Shanley (1968 – 2020), journalist, newsreader and RTÉ presenter

References

Irish-language masculine given names